Sun Li (born January 6, 1981, in Chongqing) is a female Chinese softball player. She was part of the bronze medal-winning team at the 2006 Asian Games and the fourth-placed team at the 2006 World Championship.

She competed for Team China at the 2008 Summer Olympics in Beijing.

References
Profile

1981 births
Living people
Chinese softball players
Olympic softball players of China
Sportspeople from Chongqing
Softball players at the 2004 Summer Olympics
Softball players at the 2008 Summer Olympics
Asian Games medalists in softball
Softball players at the 2006 Asian Games
Medalists at the 2006 Asian Games
Asian Games bronze medalists for China